The European Curling Championships are annual curling tournaments held in Europe between various European nations. The European Curling Championships are usually held in early to mid December. The tournament also acts as a qualifier for the World Championships, where the top eight nations qualify.

In November 1974, a six-nations tournament was held in Zürich, Switzerland which included Switzerland, Sweden, Germany, France, Italy, and Norway. In March 1975, it was decided that the championships would be competed in December.  At the semi-annual general meeting in Gävle, Sweden in April 2004, a new competition called the European Mixed Curling Championships was formed.

Champions

All-time medal table
As of the conclusion of 2022 European Curling Championships.

Combined

See also
 European Mixed Curling Championship
 European Junior Curling Challenge
 World Curling Tour
 World Qualification Event

References

 
Recurring sporting events established in 1975
International curling competitions
European championships
Curling in Europe